Kelly View School is a historic one-room school located at Appalachia, Wise County, Virginia. It likely dates to the 1890s, and is a small, one-story, one room frame building with a front gable roof.  It sits on a poured concrete foundation and is sheathed in weatherboard.  It remained in use as a school until 1959 or 1960, after which it was used as a place of worship, called Kelly View Church.

It was listed on the National Register of Historic Places in 2007.

References

One-room schoolhouses in Virginia
School buildings on the National Register of Historic Places in Virginia
Schools in Wise County, Virginia
National Register of Historic Places in Wise County, Virginia